Helen Lossi de Laugerud was a Guatemalan woman, wife of former Guatemalan President Kjell Eugenio Laugerud García, who became Guatemala's First Lady during her husband's presidential term.

During her husband's presidency, she accompanied Laugerud García to various activities such as state visits to Mexico and Colombia where she was decorated with the highest honours, as well as carried out social works for the welfare of many children. She was present during the visit of the kings of Spain Juan Carlos I and Sofia. A hospital in Cobán bears her name, as well as many streets and avenues in Guatemala.

References

Date of birth missing
Year of birth missing
Date of death missing
Year of death missing
20th-century Guatemalan people
20th-century Guatemalan women
First ladies of Guatemala